Donald Edmund Trumbull (May 27, 1909 – June 7, 2004) was an American pioneer in the field of motion picture special effects.

Life
Trumbull was born in Chicago, Illinois. He was the father of Douglas Trumbull, with whom he worked on several of these film projects. 
Trumbull died of natural causes at the age of 95 at his daughter's home in Graeagle, California.

Films worked on
 The Wizard of Oz (1939)
 Silent Running (1972)
 Close Encounters of the Third Kind (1977)
 Spaceballs (1987)

External links

Obituary of Donald Trumbull (Los Angeles Times)
Variety Obituary

1909 births
2004 deaths
People from Chicago
Special effects people